The Wright GB Hawk is a full-size single-deck bus produced by Wrightbus in Ballymena, Northern Ireland since 2021. The first all-new model to be launched by Wrightbus following their takeover by JCB, the GB Hawk is an integral design consisting of the same chassis and body design as the existing double-deck Wright StreetDeck; it is also powered by the same Daimler OM934 engine found in the StreetDeck. 

The GB Hawk replaces the Volvo B8RLE-powered Wright Eclipse 3 at the top end of the Wrightbus single-decker bus range, as they consolidate towards producing only integral vehicles, and competes with heavyweight designs such as the MCV Evora and the Scania Fencer. Production of the GB Hawk commenced in January 2021. 

The first Hawk entered service on non-passenger trials with Ipswich Buses in February 2021. Northern Irish state operator Ulsterbus were the first and so far only operator to place orders for the GB Hawk, with 123 examples entering service with the operator from mid-2021.

References

External links 
 
 Wrightbus product description

Single-deck buses
Low-floor buses
Vehicles introduced in 2021
GB Hawk